Somerset County Cricket Club is one of the 18 member clubs of the English County Championship, representing the historic county of Somerset. The club was established in August 1875 and has played first-class cricket since 1882, List A cricket since 1963, and Twenty20 cricket since 2003. Unlike most professional sports, in which a team usually has a single fixed home ground, county cricket clubs have traditionally used different grounds in various towns and cities within the county for home matches, although the use of minor "out grounds" has diminished since the 1980s. Somerset have played first class, List A, or Twenty20 matches at eighteen different grounds.

Somerset's first home first-class match was against Hampshire in 1882 at the County Ground, Taunton. This ground is the headquarters of the county club, and has hosted more Somerset matches than any other ground. It was originally known as the Taunton Athletic Ground, and featured a cycling/running track around the outside of the playing area which was later removed. Prior to the cessation of cricket during the First World War, Somerset only played at three other grounds; two in Bath, and Clarence Park in Weston-super-Mare. The Recreation Ground in Bath, the home ground of Bath Rugby, has been a regular setting for Somerset, hosting over 300 county matches. It is also Somerset's only venue other than the County Ground to have hosted a Twenty20 match. Clarence Park also frequently hosted Somerset matches until 1996, and has featured over 200 Somerset games. The next most frequently used ground is Morlands Athletic Ground in Glastonbury, where Somerset played 24 times between 1952 and 1978.

After the First World War, Somerset began playing in a wider variety of locations around the county, including three different grounds in Yeovil, and also hosted five matches at the Recreation Ground in Torquay, despite that being in Devon. They played in three different grounds in Bristol, which has been considered an independent county since 1373, though it was part of the county of Avon from 1974 until 1996, and where Gloucestershire County Cricket Club have their headquarters. After 1979, Somerset only played at the County Ground, the Recreation Ground and Clarence Park until 2012, when they faced Cardiff MCC University at Taunton Vale, their first new ground in 37 years. Somerset have not played a county match outside of Taunton since 2011, when they faced Essex in a Twenty20 match in Bath.

Grounds
Below is a complete list of grounds used by Somerset County Cricket Club for first-class, List A and Twenty20 matches. Statistics are complete through to the end of the 2022 season. Only matches played by Somerset at the grounds are recorded in the table. Matches abandoned without any play occurring are not included.

Notes

References

Bibliography
 

Grounds
 
Somerset
Somerset-related lists